Alif is a 2015 Indian Malayalam-language film directed by N. K. Muhammed Koya.

Awards

 2015 Kerala Film Critics Association Awards for upcoming director - NK Muhammed Koya
 2015  (Kerala Film Critics Association Award) for Film ALIF
 2015 17th John Abraham Special Jury mention for Film ALIF
 2015 2nd Adoor Bhasi Award for Best Film ALIF
 2015 1st Madhu Kaithapram Award for Debut Director

Cast
 Lena as Fathima
 Zeenath as Aatta
 Kalabhavan Mani as Chandran
 Nedumudi Venu as Kunhammu Saheb
 Joy Mathew as Hajyar	
 Gourav Menon as Akbar Ali	
 Irshad as Abu
 Baby Ardra as Sainu	
 Nilambur Ayisha as Ummakunju
 Santhakumari as Abu's mother
 Majeed as Jalajudeen
 Thara Kalyan as Hajiyar's wife
 Nedumbram Gopi as Namboothiri
V. K. Unnikrishnan as Seythalikka
Latheef as Sulaiman Musaliar

References

External links

2015 films
2010s Malayalam-language films